The M Countdown Chart is a record chart on the South Korean Mnet television music program M Countdown. Every week, the show awards the best-performing single on the chart in the country during its live broadcast.

In 2010, 32 singles ranked number one on the chart and 24 music acts were awarded first-place trophies. Three songs collected trophies for three weeks and achieved a triple crown: "Without U" by 2PM, "Can't Nobody" by 2NE1 and "Hoot" by Girls' Generation. No release for the year earned a perfect score, but "Can't Let You Go Even If I Die" by 2AM acquired the highest point total on the February 25 broadcast with a score of 976.

Chart history

References 

2010 in South Korean music
2010 record charts
Lists of number-one songs in South Korea